Jalalzai is a Pashtun tribe settled in Afghanistan and Baluchistan, Pakistan. It is a sub-division of the Sanzerkhel sub-tribe of Kakar. Most of the Jalalzais reside in Killa Saifullah District and in Ghazni, Afghanistan and Loralai District. It is further divided into sub-branches, namely; Jogezai, Karimzai, Kamaludinzai, Shabozai, Shahizai, Mehmanzai, Khwajezai, Babakarzai, Khudizai and Talkhanzai.

References

Pashtun tribes
Pashto-language surnames